Telectu is a Portuguese experimental, avant-garde music duo formed in 1982 by Vítor Rua (former member of GNR) and Jorge Lima Barreto, a jazz musician and musical essayist. Their music incorporates a variety of elements from free jazz, rock, electronica, minimalism and concrete music. They are arguably the most important project of its genre in Portugal. Their career spanning 30 years, includes a voluminous discography, many national and international performances and collaborations, both live and recorded, with important experimental and improvisation musicians such as Elliott Sharp, Carlos Zíngaro, Jac Berrocal, Sunny Murray, Chris Cutler amongst others. They have also composed music for theater, video art and multimedia performance.
Although the project ceased recording new material with the death of Jorge Lima Barreto in 2011, Telectu continues to perform live sporadically, with Vitor Rua and Ilda Teresa Castro.

Discography
1982 Ctu Telectu, LP, Valentim De Carvalho, EMI
1983 Belzebu, LP, Ediçao Cliché
1984 Off Off, 2xLP, 3 Macacos
1984 Performance IV Bienal De Cerveira, LP, 3 Macacos
1985 Telefone – Live Moscow, LP, Telectu, 1985
1985 Fundaçao, LP, 3 Macacos
1986 Halley, LP, CNC/Altamira
1987 Rosa-Cruz, LP, not on label (possibly: 3 Macacos)
1988 Camerata Elettronica, 2xLP, Ama Romanta
1988 Mimesis, LP, Schiu!/Transmédia
1990 Digital Buiça, LP, Tragic Figures
1990 Encounters II / Labirintho 7.8, LP, Mundo Da Cancão
1990 Live at the Knitting Factory New York City, LP, Mundo Da Cancão
1992 Evil Metal (with Elliott Sharp),  CD, Área Total
1993 Belzebu/Off Off, CD, AnAnAnA
1993 Theremin Tao, CD, SPH
1994 Biombos, CD, China Record Corporation
1995 Jazz Off Multimedia,  CD, AnAnAnA
1995 Telectu-Cutler-Berrocal, CD, Fábrica De Sons
1997 À Lagardère w/ Jac Berrocal, CD, Numérica
1998 Prélude, Rhapsodie & Coda, CD, Nova Musica
2002 Quartetos, 3xCD, Clean Feed

References

External links
http://www.last.fm/music/Telectu
https://www.youtube.com/watch?v=Ei4fFZp4eK0
https://www.youtube.com/watch?v=FMRGYkYuAew

Portuguese musical groups
Musical groups established in 1982
1982 establishments in Portugal
Musical groups disestablished in 2011
Clean Feed Records artists